The battle of Davydiv Brid was a Ukrainian counter-offensive operation during the 2022 Russian invasion of Ukraine. In reaction to Russia's southern Ukraine offensive, Ukrainian forces attempted to recapture part of the Russian-occupied Kherson Oblast and tie up Russian resources. The counter-offensive began on 27 May 2022 and was centered near the village of Davydiv Brid, which was recaptured by Ukraine, however they were pushed back over the Inhulets River by 16 June 2022. However, another bridgehead near Lozove was retained by Ukrainian forces. In a subsequent Ukrainian southern counteroffensive that was launched two and a half months later, Davydiv Brid was reported as captured by Ukrainian forces on 4 October.

Background 

On 24 February 2022, Russia invaded Ukraine, in a steep escalation of the Russo-Ukrainian War, which had begun in 2014. The invasion caused Europe's fastest-growing refugee crisis since World War II, with more than 6.5 million Ukrainians fleeing the country and a third of the population displaced. From February 24 to March 1, Russian forces took most of the Kherson Oblast, including the cities of Berdiansk and Melitopol.

On 2 March, Russian forces captured Kherson, the first major Ukrainian city to be occupied by Russia during the invasion. In March, Russian troops tried to break through the Mykolaiv Oblast, but they were repulsed by the beginning of April. After the victory of Ukrainian forces in the town of Mykolaiv, the Kherson–Mykolaiv front began to stall.

Battle 
On the afternoon of May 27, Ukraine launched a counter-offensive in the Kherson Oblast near Davydiv Brid. Ukrainian formations, led by the 5th Tank Brigade, with the support of American-made M777 howitzers, crossed the Inhulets River during the night of 27/28 May around Davydiv Brid, 50 miles northeast of Kherson. The Russians retreated from Davydiv Brid to three towns a few miles southwest, whose defense the Ukrainian General Staff described as "unfavorable." The following day new reports confirmed that Ukrainian forces carried out a successful limited counterattack, forcing Russian forces on the defensive. This Ukrainian counterattack was probably aimed at disrupting Russia's efforts to establish strong defensive positions along the southern axis and to further slow Russia's efforts to consolidate administrative control over occupied southern Ukraine.

On 31 May, satellite imagery showed that Russian troops had withdrawn from Davydiv Brid and set up positions at locations around the town in the previous few days. It was not clear at the time whether Ukrainian troops had entered the town or had positions near  and Bilohirka. However, in the evening of the same day, the fighting between the Russian and Ukrainian forces escalated. On the night between May 31 and 1 June, Ukrainian sources announced that Ukrainian forces had captured the town of Davydiv Brid.

Fierce battles between Ukrainian and Russian forces for Davydiv Brid continued in the first half of June with neither side able to assume full control. Artillery strikes became commonplace on both sides. The Ukrainian counter-offensive on Davydiv Brid was followed by a series of partisan actions by pro-Ukrainian activists, which led to intensified actions by Russia's Federal Security Service (FSB) in the Kherson region. On 6 June, Russian sources reported the Ukrainian bridgehead at Davydiv Brid had been destroyed and Ukrainian forces pushed back over the Inhulets River, which was confirmed by the Institute for the Study of War (ISW) two weeks later, affirming Russian forces had retaken the eastern bank of the river.

On 13 June, Ukrainian forces were still reported to be engaged in heavy fighting with Russian forces near Davydiv Brid. Ukrainian commanders claimed their forces gradually forced Russian troops back and were testing their second and third lines of defense. Artillery duels over the river continued between 17 and 21 June, with the ISW reporting Russian forces had pushed back Ukrainian troops sometime before 17 June. Still, on 5 July, ISW reported that Ukrainian forces retained control of some territory in the area, although precise boundaries were unclear. On 27 July, Russian forces attempted an assault on the Ukrainian bridgehead, southwest of Davydiv Brid.

Aftermath
From the end of August, Ukrainian forces again pushed towards Davydiv Brid during its counteroffensive in Kherson Oblast. From 2 to 3 October, Ukrainian forces attacked the town, but were repelled twice. Still, by 4 October, Russian forces withdrew and the town was captured by Ukrainian troops.

See also
 Southern Ukraine offensive
 Battle of Kherson
 Battle of Mykolaiv
 2022 Chornobaivka attacks

References

Battles of the 2022 Russian invasion of Ukraine
May 2022 events in Ukraine
June 2022 events in Ukraine
July 2022 events in Ukraine
August 2022 events in Ukraine
September 2022 events in Ukraine
October 2022 events in Ukraine
Southern Ukraine campaign
History of Kherson Oblast
Beryslav Raion